Vienna Bend is an unincorporated community and census-designated place (CDP) in Natchitoches Parish, Louisiana, United States. The population was 1,251 at the 2010 census.

Demographics

Notes

Unincorporated communities in Louisiana
Unincorporated communities in Natchitoches Parish, Louisiana
Census-designated places in Louisiana
Census-designated places in Natchitoches Parish, Louisiana
Populated places in Ark-La-Tex